Gani Xhafa (born 22 August 1946) is an Albanian former footballer. He played in five matches for the Albania national football team from 1967 to 1973.

References

External links
 

1946 births
Living people
Albanian footballers
Albania international footballers
Place of birth missing (living people)
Association footballers not categorized by position
Albanian football managers
FK Dinamo Tirana managers